The flea beetles, or Alticini, make up the largest tribe within the leaf beetle family (Chrysomelidae), comprising over 500 genera and approximately 8000 described species distributed worldwide.

A

 Abrarius Fairmaire, 1902
 Acallepitrix Bechyné, 1959
 Acanthonycha Jacoby, 1891
 Acrocrypta Baly, 1862
 Acrocyum Jacoby, 1885
 Adamastoraltica Biondi, Iannella & D'Alessandro, 2020
 Aedmon Clark, 1860
 Aemulaphthona Scherer, 1969
 Aeschrocnemis Weise, 1888
 Afroaltica Biondi & D'Alessandro, 2007
 Afrocrepis Bechyné, 1954
 Afrorestia Bechyné, 1959
 Agasicles Jacoby, 1905
 Alagoasa Bechyné, 1955
 Alasia Furth & Zhaurova, 2010
 Alema Sharp, 1876
 Allenaltica Prathapan, Ruan & Konstantinov, 2017
 Allochroma Clark, 1860
 Alocypha Weise, 1911
 Altica Geoffroy, 1762 (= Neoclitena Abdullah & Qureshi, 1968)
 Alytus Jacoby, 1887
 †Ambraaltica Bukejs & Konstantinov, 2013
 Amphimela Chapuis, 1875
 Analema Samuelson, 1973
 Anaxerta Fairmaire, 1902
 Andersonaltica Linzmeier & Konstantinov, 2012
 Andersonoplatus Linzmeier & Konstantinov, 2018
 Andiroba Bechyné & Bechyné, 1965
 Anelytropleurica Bechyné & Bechyné, 1964
 Anerapa Scherer, 1962
 Angulaphthona Bechyné, 1960
 Antanemora Bechyné, 1964
 Anthobiodes Weise, 1887
 Apalotrius Clark, 1860
 Aphanocera Jacoby, 1884
 Aphthona Chevrolat, 1836
 Aphthonaltica Heikertinger, 1924
 Aphthonella Jacoby, 1889
 Aphthonoides Jacoby, 1885
 Apleuraltica Bechyné, 1956
 Apraea Baly, 1877
 Apteraltica Medvedev, 2004
 Apteropeda Chevrolat, 1836
 Araguaenia Bechyné, 1968
 Araoua Bechyné, 1955
 †Archealtica Nadein, 2015
 Archilactica Bechyné & Bechyné, 1975
 Argopistes Motschulsky, 1860
 Argopistoides Jacoby, 1892 (= Torodera Weise, 1902)
 Argopus Fischer von Waldheim, 1824
 Argusonychis Konstantinov, Van Roie & Furth, 2022
 Arrhenocoela Foudras, 1861
 Arsipoda Erichson, 1842
 Asiophrida Medvedev, 1999
 Asphaera Duponchel & Chevrolat, 1842
 Asphaerina Bechyné, 1963
 Asutosha Maulik, 1926
 Atyphus Clark, 1860
 Aulacothorax Boheman, 1858  (= Orthaltica Horn, 1889)
 Aulonodera Champion, 1918
 Axillofebra Samuelson, 1969
 Ayalaia Bechyné & Bechyné, 1960

B

 Babiohaltica Bechyné, 1955
 Balimistika Dawood & Takizawa, 2013
 Balzanica Bechyné, 1959
 Bangalaltica Bechyné, 1960
 Baoshanaltica Ruan & Konstantinov in Ruan et al., 2017
 Batophila Foudras, 1860
 Bechuana Scherer, 1970
 Bechynella Biondi & D'Alessandro, 2010
 Bellacincta Scherer, 1962
 Bellaltica Reid, 1988
 Benedictus Scherer, 1969
 Benficana Bechyné & Bechyné, 1961
 Bezdekaltica Döberl, 2012
 Bhamoina Bechyné, 1958
 Bikasha Maulik, 1931
 Bimala Maulik, 1926
 Blakealtica Viswajyothi & Konstantinov, 2020
 Blepharida Chevrolat, 1836
 Blepharidina Bechyné, 1968
 Bonfilsus Scherer, 1967
 Borbaita Bechyné, 1957
 Borinken Konstantinov & Konstantinova, 2011
 Borneocycla Medvedev, 2007
 Brachyscelis Germar, 1934
 Brasilaphthona Bechyné, 1956
 Bubiscus Savini, Furth & Joly, 2009
 Burumoseria Csiki, 1939 (formerly Moseria Weise, 1922)

C

 Cacoscelis Chevrolat, 1836
 Caeporis Clark, 1865
 Calipeges Clark, 1860
 Callangaltica Bechyné, 1958
 Calliphron Jacoby, 1891
 Caloscelis Clark, 1865
 Calotheca Heyden, 1887
 †Cambaltica Nadein, 2019
 Cangshanaltica Konstantinov, Chamorro, Prathapan, Ge & Yang, 2013
 Capraita Bechyné, 1957
 Carcharodis Weise, 1910
 Carecuruna Bechyné & Bechyné, 1965
 Carminaltica Bechyné & Bechyné, 1961
 Celisaltica Biondi, 2001
 Centralaphthona Bechyné, 1960
 Cerichrestus Clark, 1860
 Cerotrus Jacoby, 1884
 Chabria Jacoby, 1887
 Chaetocnema Stephens, 1831
 Chaillucola Bechyné, 1968
 Chalaenaria Medvedev, 2003
 Chalaenosoma Jacoby, 1893
 Chalatenanganya Bechyné & Bechyné, 1963
 Chaloenus Westwood, 1862
 Chanealtica Konstantinov, 2016
 Chaparena Bechyné, 1959
 Chilocoristes Weise, 1895
 Chirodica Germar, 1834
 Chlamophora Chevrolat, 1836
 Chorodecta Harold, 1875
 Chrysogramma Jacoby, 1885
 Chrysomila Savini, Escalona & Furth, 2008
 Ciguapanychis Konstantinov, Van Roie & Furth, 2022
 Clavicornaltica Scherer, 1974
 Cleonica Jacoby, 1887
 Cleophes Jacoby, 1886
 Clitea Baly, 1877
 Collartaltica Bechyné, 1959
 Conococha Bechyné, 1958
 Cornulactica Bechyné, 1955
 Coroicona Bechyné, 1956
 Corynothona Bechyné, 1956
 Crepichaeta Medvedev, 1993
 Crepicnema Scherer, 1969
 †Crepidocnema Moseyko, Kirejtshuk & Nel, 2010
 Crepidodera Chevrolat, 1836
 Crepidoderoides Chûjô, 1942
 Crepidosoma Chen, 1939
 Crimissa Stal, 1858
 Cuyabasa Bechyné, 1959
 Cyrsylus Jacoby, 1891

D

 †Davidaltica Nadein, 2019
 Decaria Weise, 1895
 Deciplatus Linzmeier & Konstantinov, 2009
 Demarchus Jacoby, 1887
 Dentilabra Medvedev, 2009
 Derocrepis Weise, 1886
 Deuteraltica Bechyné, 1960
 Diacacoscelis Bechyné, 1968
 Diamphidia Gerstaecker, 1855
 Dibolia Latreille, 1829
 Dimonikaea Bechyné, 1968
 Dinaltica Bechyné, 1956
 Diosyphraea Bechyné, 1959
 Diphaltica Barber, 1941
 Diphaulaca Chevrolat, 1836
 Diphaulacosoma Jacoby, 1892
 Discotarsa Medvedev, 1993
 Disonycha Chevrolat, 1836
 Disonychodes Bechyné, 1955
 Distigmoptera Blake, 1943
 Djallonia Bechyné, 1955
 Docema Waterhouse, 1877
 Docemina Champion, 1918
 Dodericrepa Bechyné, 1951
 Doeberlnotus Prathapan, Ruan & Konstantinov, 2017
 Doloresa Bechyné, 1955
 Drakensbergianella Biondi & D'Alessandro, 2003
 Dunbrodya Jacoby, 1906
 Dysphenges Horn, 1894

E

 Egleraltica Bechyné & Bechyné, 1965
 Elithia Chapuis, 1875
 Elytropachys Motschulsky, 1866
 Enneomacra Bechyné & Bechyné, 1961
 Epitrix Foudras, 1860
 Erinaceialtica Konstantinov & Linzmeier, 2020
 Eriotica Harold, 1877
 Erystana Medvedev, 2010
 Erystus Jacoby, 1885
 Etapocanga Duckett, 1994
 Eudolia Jacoby, 1885
 Eudoliamorpha Scherer, 1989
 Eudoliomima Medvedev, 2004
 Eugoniola Csiki, 1940
 Eupeges Clark, 1860
 Euphenges Clark, 1860
 Euphitrea Baly, 1875
 Euplatysphaera Özdikmen, 2008 (formerly Platysphaera Medvedev, 2001, also known as Platysphaerina Medvedev, 2009)
 Euplectroscelis Crotch, 1873
 Eurylegna Weise, 1910
 Eutornus Clark, 1860
 Eutrea Baly, 1875
 Exartematopus Clark, 1860
 Exaudita Bechyné, 1955
 Exoceras Jacoby, 1891

F

 Febra Clark, 1864
 Forsterita Bechyné, 1959
 Furthia Medvedev, 1999

G

 Gabonia Jacoby, 1893
 Gansuapteris Ruan & Konstantinov in Ruan et al., 2017
 Genaphthona Bechyné, 1956
 Gethosynus Clark, 1860
 Gioia Bechyné, 1955 (= Sidfaya Blake, 1964)
 Glaucosphaera Maulik, 1926
 Glenidion Clark, 1860
 Glyptina LeConte, 1859
 Goniosystena Bechyné, 1997
 Gopala Maulik, 1926
 Goweria Lea, 1926
 Grammicopterus Blanchard, 1851
 †Groehnaltica Bukejs, Reid & Biondi, 2020
 Guadeloupena Bechyné, 1956
 Guilelmia Weise, 1924
 Guinerestia Scherer, 1959

H

 Haemaltica Chen, 1933
 Halticorcus Lea, 1917
 Halticotropis Fairmaire, 1886
 Heikertingerella Csiki, 1940
 Heikertingeria Csiki, 1940
 Hemiglyptus Horn, 1889
 Hemilactica Blake, 1937
 Hemiphrynus Horn, 1889
 Hemipyxis Dejean, 1836
 Hemipyxoides Döberl, 2007
 Hermaeophaga Foudras, 1860
 Hermenegilda Bechyné, 1958
 Hespera Weise, 1889
 Hesperella Medvedev, 1995
 Hesperoides Biondi, 2017
 Heyrovskya Madar & Madar, 1968
 Hildenbrandtina Weise, 1910
 Hippuriphila Foudras, 1861
 Hirtasphaera Medvedev, 2004
 Hirtiaphthona Kimoto, 2000
 Homelea Jacoby, 1884
 Homichloda Weise, 1902
 Homoschema Blake, 1950
 Homotyphus Clark, 1860
 Hornaltica Barber, 1941
 Huarinillasa Bechyné, 1959
 Hydmosyne Clark, 1860
 Hylodromus Clark, 1860
 Hypantherus Clark, 1860
 Hyphaltica Blackburn, 1896
 Hyphalticoda Oke, 1932
 Hyphasis Harold, 1877
 Hypolampsis Clark, 1860

I

 Idaltica Bechyné, 1955
 Iphitrea Baly, 1864
 Iphitroides Jacoby, 1891
 Iphitromela Bechyné, 1997
 Iphitroxena Bechyné, 1997
 Itapiranga Bechyné, 1956
 Ivalia Jacoby, 1887

J

 Jacobyana Maulik, 1926
 Jobia Kirsch, 1877

K

 Kamala Maulik, 1926
 Kanonga Bechyné, 1960
 Kashmirobia Konstantinov & Prathapan, 2006
 Kenialtica Bechyné, 1960
 Kimongona Bechyné, 1959
 Kiskeya Konstantinov & Chamorro-Lacayo, 2006
 Kuschelina Bechyné, 1951

L

 Laboissierea Pic, 1927
 Laboissierella Chen, 1933
 Lacpatica Bechyné & Bechyné, 1977
 Lacpaticoides Bechyné & Bechyné, 1960
 Lactina Harold, 1875
 Lampedona Weise, 1907
 Lanka Maulik, 1926 (= Neorthella Medvedev, 2010)
 Laosaltica Chen, 1961 (= Laosia Chen, 1934)
 Laotzeus Chen, 1933
 Laselva Furth, 2007
 Lepialtica Scherer, 1962
 Leptodibolia Chen, 1941
 Leptophysa Baly, 1887
 Lesneana Chen, 1933
 Letzuella Chen, 1933
 Linaltica Samuelson, 1973
 Lipromela Chen, 1933
 Lipromima Heikertinger, 1924
 Lipromorpha Chûjô & Kimoto, 1960
 Liprus Motschulsky, 1861
 Litosonycha Chevrolat, 1836 (= Pleurasphaera Bechyné, 1958)
 Loeblaltica Scherer, 1989
 Longitarsus Latreille, 1829
 Loxoprosopus Guérin-Méneville, 1844
 Luperaltica Crotch, 1873
 Luperomorpha Weise, 1887
 Lupraea Jacoby, 1885
 Lypnea Baly, 1876
 Lypneana Medvedev, 2001
 Lysathia Bechyné, 1959
 Lythraria Bedel, 1897

M

 Maaltica Samuelson, 1969
 Macrohaltica Bechyné, 1959
 Malvernia Jacoby, 1899
 Mandarella Duvivier, 1892
 Manobia Jacoby, 1885
 Manobiella Medvedev, 1993
 †Manobiomorpha Nadein, 2010
 Mantura Stephens, 1831
 Marcapatia Bechyné, 1958
 Margaridisa Bechyné, 1958
 Maritubana Bechyné & Bechyné, 1961
 Maturacaita Bechyné & Bechyné, 1977
 Maulika Basu & Sengupta, 1980
 Megasus Jacoby, 1884
 Megistops Boheman, 1859
 Meishania Chen & Wang, 1980
 Mellipora Chûjô, 1965
 Menduos Linzmeier & Konstantinov, 2020
 Meraaltica Scherer, 1962
 Mesodera Jacoby, 1885
 Mesopana Medvedev, 2018
 Metroserrapha Bechyné, 1958
 Micraphthona Jacoby, 1900
 Micrespera Chen & Wang, 1987
 Microcrepis Chen, 1933
 Microdonacia Blackburn, 1893
 Microsutrea Jacoby, 1894
 Minota Kutschera, 1859
 Minotula Weise, 1924
 Miritius Bechyné & Bechyné, 1965
 Mistika Mohamedsaid, 2001
 Mniophila Stephens, 1831
 Mniophilosoma Wollaston, 1854
 Monomacra Chevrolat, 1836
 Monotalla Bechyné, 1956
 Montiaphthona Scherer, 1961
 Morylus Jacoby, 1887
 Myrcina Chapuis, 1875
 Myrcinoides Jacoby, 1894
 Myrmeconycha Konstantinov & Tishechkin, 2017

N

 Nankus Chen, 1933
 Nasidia Harold, 1876
 Nasigona Jacoby, 1902
 Neoacanthobioides Bechyné & Bechyné, 1976
 Neoblepharella Özdikmen, 2008 (formerly Blepharella Medvedev, 1999)
 Neocacoscelis Bechyné, 1968
 Neocrepidodera Heikertinger, 1911
 Neodera Duvivier, 1891
 Neodiphaulaca Bechyné & Bechyné, 1975
 Neopraea Jacoby, 1885
 Neorthana Medvedev, 1996
 Neosphaeroderma Savini & Furth, 2001
 Neothona Bechyné, 1955
 Nephrica Harold, 1877
 Nesaecrepida Blake, 1964
 Nicaltica Konstantinov, Chamorro-Lacayo & Savini, 2009
 Nisotra Baly, 1864
 Nonarthra Baly, 1862
 Normaltica Konstantinov, 2002
 Notomela Jacoby, 1899
 Notozona Chevrolat, 1836
 Novascuta Özdikmen, 2008 (formerly Ascuta Medvedev, 1997)
 Novofoudrasia Jacobson, 1901
 Ntaolaltica Biondi & D'Alessandro, 2013
 Nycteronychis Bechyné, 1955
 Nzerekorena Bechyné, 1955

O

 Ochrosis Foudras, 1861
 Ocnoscelis Eruchson, 1847
 Octogonotes Drapiez, 1819
 Oedionychis Latreille, 1829
 Omeiana Chen, 1934
 Omeisphaera Chen & Zia, 1974
 Omophoita Chevrolat, 1836
 Omototus Clark, 1860
 Ophrida Chapuis, 1875
 Opisthopygme Blackburn, 1896
 Oreinodera Bechyné & Bechyné, 1963
 Orestia Chevrolat, 1836
 Orhespera Chen & Wang, 1984
 Orisaltata Prathapan & Konstantinov, 2006
 Orodes Jacoby, 1891

P

 Pachyonychis Clark, 1860
 Pachyonychus Crotch, 1873
 Palaeothona Jacoby, 1885
 Palmaraltica Bechyné, 1959
 Palopoda Erichson, 1847
 Panchrestus Clark, 1860
 Panilurus Jacoby, 1904
 †Paolaltica Biondi, 2014
 Paracacoscelis Bechyné & Bechyné, 1861
 Paradibolia Baly, 1875
 Paralactica Bechyné & Bechyné, 1961
 Paralacticoides Bechyné & Bechyné, 1977
 Paraminota Scherer, 1989
 Paraminotella Döberl & Konstantinov, 2003
 Paranaita Bechyné, 1955
 Parargopus Chen, 1939
 Parasutra Medvedev, 1994
 Parasyphraea Bechyné, 1959
 Parategyrius Kimoto & Gressitt, 1966 (= Lankanella Kimoto, 2000 = Lankaphthona Medvedev, 2001 = Paraphthona Medvedev, 2009)
 Parathrylea Duvivier, 1892
 Paratonfania Medvedev, 1993
 Parazipangia Ohno, 1965
 Parchicola Bechyné & Bechyné, 1975
 Parecynovia Bechyné, 1958
 Parhespera Chen, 1932
 Parlina Motschulsky, 1866
 Parophrida Chen, 1934
 Pedethma Weise, 1923
 Pedilia Clark, 1865
 Peltobothrus Enderlein, 1912
 Penghou Ruan, Konstantinov, Prathapan, Ge & Yang, 2015
 Pentamesa Harold, 1876
 Pepila Weise, 1923
 Perichilona Weise, 1919
 Phaelota Jacoby, 1887
 Phenrica Bechyné, 1957
 Philocalis Boisduval, 1835
 Philogeus Jacoby, 1887
 Philopona Weise, 1903
 Philostogya Weise, 1929
 Phrynocepha Baly, 1861
 Phydanis Horn, 1889
 Phygasia Chevrolat, 1836
 Phygasoma Jacoby, 1898
 Phylacticus Clark, 1860
 Phyllotreta Chevrolat, 1836
 Physimerus Clark, 1860
 Physodactyla Chapuis, 1875
 Physoma Clark, 1863
 Physomandroya Bechyné, 1959
 Physonychis Clark, 1860
 Piobuckia Bechyné, 1956
 Platiprosopus Chevrolat, 1834
 Platycepha Baly, 1878
 Plectrotetra Baly, 1862
 Pleuraltica Sharp, 1886
 Pleurochroma Clark, 1860
 Podagrica Chevrolat, 1836
 Podagricella Chen, 1933
 Podagricomela Heikertinger, 1924
 Podaltica Bechyné & Bechyné, 1963
 Podontia Dalman, 1824
 Polyclada Chevrolat, 1835
 Prasona Baly, 1861
 Pratima Maulik, 1931
 Primulavorus Konstantinov & Ruan in Ruan et al., 2017
 Priobolia Chen & Wang, 1987
 Procalus Clark, 1865
 Profebra Samuelson, 1967
 Propiasus Csiki, 1939
 Prosplecestha Weise, 1921
 †Protorthaltica Nadein, 2019
 Protopsilapha Bechyné & Bechyné, 1973
 Pseudadorium Fairmaire, 1885
 Pseudaphthona Jacoby, 1903
 Pseudargopus Chen, 1933
 Pseudodera Baly, 1861
 Pseudodibolia Jacoby, 1891
 Pseudodisonycha Blake, 1954
 Pseudophygasia Biondi & D'Alessandro, 2013
 Pseudogona Jacoby, 1885
 Pseudolampsis Horn, 1889
 Pseudoliprus Chûjô & Kimoto, 1960
 Pseudorthygia Csiki, 1940
 Pseudostenophyma Furth, 2010
 Psilapha Clark, 1865
 Psylliodes Latreille, 1829
 †Psyllototus Nadein, 2010
 Ptocadica Harold, 1876
 Pydaristes Harold, 1875
 Pyxidaltica Bechyné, 1956

R

 Resistenciana Bechyné, 1958
 Rhinotmetus Clark, 1860
 Rhynchasphaera Bechyné, 1955
 Rhypetra Baly, 1875
 Roicus Clark, 1860
 Rosalactica Bechyné & Bechyné, 1977

S

 Sahyadrialtica Prathapan & Konstantinov, 2022
 Sanariana Bechyné, 1955
 Sanckia Duvivier, 1891
 Sangariola Jacobson, 1922
 Scelidopsis Jacoby, 1888
 Sebaethoides Chen, 1934
 Sericopus Medvedev, 2005
 Serraphula Jacoby, 1897
 Sesquiphaera Bechyné, 1958
 Setsaltica Samuelson, 1971
 Seychellaltica Biondi, 2002
 Simaethea Baly, 1865
 Sinaltica Chen, 1939
 Sinocrepis Chen, 1933
 Sinosphaera Ruan & Konstantinov in Ruan et al., 2017
 Sittacella Weise, 1923
 Sjoestedtinia Weise, 1910
 Sophraena Baly, 1865
 Sophraenella Jacoby, 1904
 Sparnus Clark, 1860
 Sphaeraltica Ohno, 1961 (formerly Lesagealtica Döberl, 2009)
 Sphaerochabria Medvedev, 1999
 Sphaeroderma Stephens, 1831
 Sphaerodermella Ogloblin, 1930
 Sphaerometopa Chapuis, 1875
 Sphaeronychus Dejean, 1837
 Sphaerophrida Chen, 1934
 Sphaeropleura Jacoby, 1887
 Stegnaspea Baly, 1877
 Stegnea Baly, 1879
 Stenoluperus Ogloblin, 1936
 Stenophyma Baly, 1877
 Stevenaltica Konstantinov, Linzmeier & Savini, 2014
 Strabala Chevrolat, 1836
 Stuckenbergiana Scherer, 1963
 Styrepitrix Bechyné & Bechyné, 1963
 †Sucinolivolia Bukejs, Biondi & Alekseev, 2015
 Suetes Jacoby, 1891
 Suffrianaltica Konstantinov & Linzmeier, 2020
 Sumatrahaltica Döberl, 2007
 Sutrea Baly, 1876
 Syphrea Baly, 1876
 Systena Chevrolat, 1836

T

 Taiwanohespera Kimoto, 1970
 Taiwanoliprus Komiya, 2006
 Taiwanorestia Kimoto, 1991
 Tamdaoana Medvedev, 2009
 Tebalia Fairmaire, 1889
 Tegyrius Jacoby, 1887
 Temnocrepis Bechyné & Bechyné, 1963
 Tenosis Clark, 1865
 Teresopolisia Bechyné, 1956
 Terpnochlorus Fairmaire, 1904
 Tetragonotes Clark, 1860
 Thrasychroma Jacoby, 1885 (= Licyllus Jacoby, 1885)
 Tonfania Chen, 1936
 Toxaria Weise, 1903
 Trachytetra Sharp, 1886
 Tribolia Chen, 1933
 Trichaltica Harold, 1876
 Trifiniocola Bechyné & Bechyné, 1963
 Triphaltica Bechyné, 1968
 Tritonaphthona Bechyné, 1960

U

 Ugandaltica D'Alessandro & Biondi, 2018
 Ulrica Scherer, 1862
 Upembaltica Bechyné, 1960
 Utingaltica Bechyné, 1961

V

 Vilhenaltica Bechyné & Bechyné, 1964

W

 Walterianella Bechyné, 1955
 Wanderbiltiana Bechyné, 1955
 Warchaltica Döberl, 2007
 Wittmeraltica Bechyné, 1956

X

 Xanthophysca Fairmaire, 1901
 Xenidea Baly, 1862
 Xuthea Baly, 1865

Y

 Yaminia Prathapan & Konstantinov, 2007
 Yemenaltica Scherer, 1985
 Yetialtica Döberl, 1991
 Yoshiakia Takizawa, 2009
 Yumaphthona Bechyné & Bechyné, 1976
 Yungaltica Bechyné, 1959
 Yunohespera Chen & Wang, 1984
 Yunotrichia Chen & Wang, 1980

Z

 Zangaltica Chen & Wang, 1988
 Zeteticus Harold, 1875
 Zipanginia Ohno, 1962
 Zomba Bryant, 1922

References

Flea beetle